Dorjjavyn Luvsansharav (1900 – July 30, 1941) was Secretary of the Mongolian People's Revolutionary Party (MPRP) from 1932 to 1937 and served as Chief Secretary from 1933 to 1934.  A central figure during the violent Stalinist repressions in Mongolia, Luvsansharav presided over arrests, torture, and executions of over 25,000 “enemies of the revolution” between 1937 and 1939 and was instrumental in the violent purges of Prime Ministers Peljidiin Genden and Anandyn Amar.   He ultimately fell victim to the purges himself, was arrested in 1939 on charges of counterrevolution and executed in Moscow in 1941.

Early life and career
Luvsansharav was born in 1900 in Zasagt Khan Province (present day Ikh-Uul) district of Khövsgöl Province.  At the age of 10 he was sent to Möröngiin Khuree monastery to become a lama, but fled in 1921.  He joined the MPRP in 1925, first heading up a local MPRP cell and then attending the Party school in Ulaanbaatar in 1927 where he made a name for himself combating rightists in the student body.   After attending the Communist University of the Toilers of the East in Moscow from 1928 to 1929, he returned to take up leadership of the MPRP in Khan-Taishir-Uul province (present day Zavkhan Province).

One of several “new leftists” promoted during the Eight Party Congress in 1930,  Luvsansharav first headed a department at the Presidium of the MPRP Central Committee and then became a member of the presidium and deputy secretary  of the Central Committee before being elected one of three secretaries of Central Committee in June 1932 (a position he would hold until 1937).  From June 30, 1933 to October 5, 1934 he served as First Secretary of the Central Committee.

Stalinist repressions in Mongolia

Purge of Genden 1936
Luvsansharav was a staunch opponent of Prime Minister Peljidiin Genden, openly challenging many of his decisions and looking for opportunities to undercut him.  He led calls within MPRP Central Committee for the prime minister's dismissal after Genden had confronted Stalin in contentious meetings, refusing to persecute Mongolia's Buddhist Church, publicly calling him a Russian tsar, and even slapping the pipe from Stalin's mouth during a Mongolian Embassy reception.  Within four months Genden was stripped of all his government positions and sent off to the USSR “for medical treatment.”  He was arrested and executed a year later for counterrevolutionary activities and spying for Japan.

Extraordinary Purge Commission 1937–1939
In 1937 Luvsansharav received five months of political and organizational training in Moscow to prepare him to manage the purges that Stalin was planning to unleash in Mongolia. On October 2, 1937, he was appointed one of three members (along with Interior Minister Khorloogiin Choibalsan and Minister of Justice Tserendorj) of the Extraordinary Purge Commission or troika, that presided over arrest cases, investigations, and show trials involving “lamas, espionage and counterrevolution.”  At the first show trial on October 18, 1937 at the Central Theater, thirteen of the fourteen facing the troika, including former prime minister (1921) and chief abbot of the Manzushir Monastery Sambadondogiin Tserendorj, were sentenced to death.

From October 1937 to April 1939, Luvsansharav's troika investigated 25,785 cases and condemned 20,099 persons, including over 16,000 lamas, to execution.  25 persons from the top leadership of the party, 187 persons from the military leadership, and thirty six of the fifty one members of the central committee were executed.  Although described as an “unremarkable person who rarely attracted notice, a coward with latent sadistic tendencies”, Luvsansharav became  known as a skilled “extractor of confessions.”

Purge of Amar 1939

By early 1939 Stalin was eager to replace the popular Prime Minister Anandyn Amar with Choibalsan, his new favorite.   At meetings with Soviet leadership in Moscow, Choibalsan was instructed to have Luvsansharav launch a propaganda campaign against Amar. Luvsansharav denounced Amar at an enlarged meeting of the MPRP Central Committee on March 6, 1939.  Once Choibalsan seconded the condemnation, opinions within the Central Committee rapidly turned against Amar, who was arrested on the spot and transported to Moscow where he was sentenced to death by a Soviet troika on July 10, 1941.

End of the purge
With most internal opposition extinguished and the threat of Japanese military expansion rising on Mongolia's eastern borders, Stalin ordered Choibalsan to bring the purges to an end.  During a special conference at Interior Ministry on April 20, 1939 both Choibalsan and Luvsansharav faked tears of regret for allowing overly zealous Interior Ministry officials and renegade Soviet advisors to carry out the purges.  Official blame fell on Deputy Interior Minister Natsantogtoh and Soviet advisor Kichikov.

Arrest and death
In the summer of 1939 most of the “henchmen” of the purges, including Nasantogtoh, Bayasgalan, Dashtseveg and Luvsandorj, were rounded up, arrested, and sent off to Moscow as part of “mop up” operations to eliminate witnesses to the repressions. Luvsansharav was arrested on July 9, 1939 by ministry of internal affairs officials.  Charged with counterrevolution, Luvsansharav was transported to Moscow where he was incarcerated in the same prison with former Prime Minister Amar before he was found guilty by the Military Collegium of the USSR Supreme Court on July 5 and executed on July 30, 1941.

Rehabilitation
Despite Luvsansharav's active role in carrying out the purges (Mongolian historian Baabar believes Soviet leaders had eyed Luvsansharav as a potential replacement for Choibalsan should the latter fail to carry out Moscow's instructions on the purges), he was nevertheless viewed as a victim by the special commission established under the presidium of the People's Great Hural to review purge cases of the 1930s and 1940s and was rehabilitated in 1962.

Notes

Bibliography
 
 
 

1900 births
1941 deaths
Mongolian communists
Mongolian People's Party politicians
Great Purge victims from Mongolia
Soviet rehabilitations
People from Khövsgöl Province
Great Purge perpetrators
Mongolian people executed abroad
Executed communists